Lars Christian Andreas Ekberg (born 2 January 1985), known as Andreas Ekberg, is a Swedish football referee. Ekberg currently resides in Malmö. He has been a full-time international referee for FIFA since 2013. He became a professional referee in 2004 and has been an Allsvenskan referee since 2009. Ekberg has refereed 185 matches in Allsvenskan, 56 matches in Superettan and 72 international matches as of 2021. Ekberg began refereeing matches in Torns IF when he was 13 years old.

See also 
 List of football referees

References

External links 
FIFA
SvFF
 
 
 
 

1985 births
Living people
Swedish football referees
UEFA Euro 2020 referees